{{Speciesbox
|name = Iron Range hibiscus
|image = Hibiscus tozerensis Royal Botanic Garden Sydney flowers.jpg
|image_caption = Royal Botanic Gardens, Sydney
|status =
|status_system =
|status_ref =
|genus = Hibiscus
|species = tozerensis
|authority = Craven & B.E.Pfeil
|synonyms = <small>Macrostelia grandifolia</small>
}}Hibiscus tozerensis'', the Iron Range hibiscus, is shrub to small tree, growing from one to six metres tall. Found in the Iron Range, Queensland, Australia.

References

tozerensis
Flora of Queensland